West Adelaide was an electoral district of the House of Assembly in the Australian state of South Australia from 1862 to 1902.

The electoral district was created when the Electoral district of City of Adelaide was abolished in 1862 and West Adelaide and East Adelaide were created. The district of Adelaide was ultimately recreated in 1902 by the recombination of West and East Adelaide.

It was created by the Electoral Districts Act (No. 20) of the South Australian parliament in 1861 but it was not until the state election of 1862 election that candidates were first elected to represent West Adelaide. The electorate at its creation included all of the City of Adelaide (South Adelaide, North Adelaide and the Adelaide parklands) west of the centres of King William Street, Poole street, John Street and O'Connell Street.

In 1872 the area of the electorate shrunk when the Electoral district of North Adelaide was created by excising those parts of East and West Adelaide south of the River Torrens.

Members

References
Former Members of the Parliament of South Australia

Former electoral districts of South Australia
1862 establishments in Australia
1902 disestablishments in Australia